Salt Fork State Park is a public recreation area located  north of Lore City in Guernsey County, Ohio. The grounds include the Kennedy Stone House, which is listed on the National Register of Historic Places. The park is managed by the Ohio Department of Natural Resources Division of Parks and Watercraft.

History
Salt Fork was named for a mineral lick along the creek's course. Plans to dam the creek for use as a water source began in 1956, then switched to planning for use as a recreational area in 1960. An earthen dam was completed in 1967, with the construction of recreational facilities initiated in 1968. Salt Fork Lodge opened in 1972

Activities and amenities
The park features an 18-hole golf course, 2,500-foot swimming beach, two marinas and seven boat launching ramps, fishing for largemouth bass, crappie, bluegill, walleye and muskellunge, hunting, picnicking facilities, trails for hiking, snowmobiling, and equestrian use, miniature golf, nature center, and an archery range.

References

External links
 Salt Fork State Park Ohio Department of Natural Resources
 Salt Fork State Park Map Ohio Department of Natural Resources
 Salt Fork State Park Lodge US Hotels

State parks of Ohio
Protected areas of Guernsey County, Ohio
Protected areas established in 1960
1960 establishments in Ohio
Nature centers in Ohio